Bruce Cleland (born 26 September 1958) is a Scottish former professional footballer who played as a forward.

Career
Born in Paisley, Cleland played for Maryhill, Albion Rovers, Motherwell, Ayr United, Barrow, Queen of the South, Stranraer and East Kilbride Thistle.

References

1958 births
Living people
Scottish footballers
Maryhill F.C. players
Albion Rovers F.C. players
Motherwell F.C. players
Ayr United F.C. players
Barrow A.F.C. players
Queen of the South F.C. players
Stranraer F.C. players
East Kilbride Thistle F.C. players
Scottish Football League players
Association football forwards